Nick Vanoff (October 25, 1929 – March 20, 1991) was a dancer, producer and philanthropist.

Early life
Vanoff was born in the village of Banitsa, Greece. He grew up in Buffalo, New York. He served in the United States Marine Corps, and, shortly after, studied directing with Theodore Komisarjevsky in New York City.

Career
Vanoff started his career as a dancer in Charles Weidman's Dance Theatre. Later, he was a lead dancer for the New York City Opera. He was also a dance in the Kiss Me, Kate Broadway musical.

Vanoff was a cue card holder on The Perry Como Show and later became its associate producer. Together with William O. Harbach, he co-produced The Tonight Show, when Steve Allen was the host. Additionally, he created and produced the Kennedy Center Honors. In the 1960s, he produced more than ten hours of television every week, including shows with Bing Crosby, Andy Williams, Don Knotts, Milton Berle and Sonny and Cher. A few decades later, in 1985, he produced the film Eleni.

Vanoff won a Tony Award for Best Musical in 1990 for his production of the City of Angels musical on Broadway. Additionally, he won five Emmy Awards as a producer for: The Julie Andrews Hour in 1973, The Kennedy Center Honors in 1984, 1987 and 1989, and Julie Andrews's special, The Sound of Christmas, in 1988. In 1990, he was named Showman of the Year by the Publicists Guild of America (which later merged into the International Alliance of Theatrical Stage Employees).

Vanoff was a founding director of the Foundation for the Joffrey Ballet. He also sat on the board of directors of the Center Theatre Group in Los Angeles.

Personal life
Vanoff was married to Felisa Vanoff (1925-2014). They had two sons, Nicholas and Flavio. They resided in Beverly Hills, California.

Death
Vanoff died of cardiac arrest at the Ronald Reagan UCLA Medical Center in Los Angeles, California. He was sixty-one. His funeral was held at the Church of the Good Shepherd in Beverly Hills, California.

References

1929 births
1991 deaths
Greek emigrants to the United States
People from Beverly Hills, California
United States Marines
American male dancers
American theatre managers and producers
Philanthropists from New York (state)
Tony Award winners
Emmy Award winners
American people of Bulgarian descent
20th-century American businesspeople
20th-century American dancers
20th-century American philanthropists
People from Meliti (municipal unit)